The jaws ratio is a measure used in finance to demonstrate the extent to which a trading entity's income growth rate exceeds its expenses growth rate, measured as a percentage.

Strictly speaking, it is not a true ratio in that the calculation is not expressed as one number divided by another, and is calculated as follows:

 . The jaws ratio is calculated by subtracting the expense growth rate from the income growth rate.

The jaws ratio is significant in that a larger positive value demonstrates that a trading entity is effectively generating more income over time than it is generating expenses, thereby potentially increasing its profitability, and profitability growth rate.

The ratio may also be a negative percentage, which should be a cause for concern for the owners/management of a trading entity as this will over time result in eroded profitability.

Financial ratios